Cabdio morar, the morari, is a species of freshwater fish from the carp family (Cyprinidae). It ranges from Iran, through northern South Asia, to Myanmar. The scientific name of the species was first published in 1822 by Hamilton.

References

Fish of Thailand
Cyprinid fish of Asia
Fish described in 1822